Gustaf von Numers (born 21 March 1848 in Maxmo; died 6 February 1913 in Kannus) was a Swedish-speaking Finnish author and station master.

Numers learned to know the theater man Kaarlo Bergbom in 1887. Bergbom got to read some of Numers's plays and set up several of his plays on the Finnish teater in Helsinki, for instance his debut piece Erik Puke in 1888. Numers wrote in Swedish, but was performed in Finnish. He was also serving as a station master in Bennäs from 1884, and in Kannus 1908–1913.

Selective bibliography
Bakom Kuopio
Dramatiska arbeten
Klas Kurck och liten Elin
Pastor Jussilainen
Striden vid Tuukkala
Tuukkasson
Vid Lützen
The tragedy of Elina

External links

1848 births
1913 deaths
People from Vörå
People from Vaasa Province (Grand Duchy of Finland)
Finnish people of German descent
Finnish writers in Swedish